Aethes razowskii, Razowski's aethes moth, is a species of moth of the family Tortricidae. It is found in North America, where it has been recorded from Nova Scotia, Quebec, Alabama, Connecticut, Idaho, Indiana, Maine, Maryland, Michigan, New Hampshire and Vermont.

The ground colour of the forewings is cream with buff, orange yellow, dark brown and fuscous markings, bordered by darker scales. The hindwings are dark drab. Adults have been recorded from May to September, probably in multiple generations per year.

Etymology
The species is named after Józef Razowski.

References

razowskii
Moths described in 2002
Moths of North America